The 1930 Canadian National Challenge Cup was won by the Westminster Royals of British Columbia by 2 games to 1 in the 3 game series.

The Canadian final was watched by 7,000 fans in Winnipeg.

Qualifiers
Calgary Hillhursts def. Edmonton Callies (Alberta Final)

Westminster Royals def. Calgary Hillhursts (BC/AB Final)

Westminster Royals def. Winnipeg Hearts (Western Final)

National Final
2 games to 1

Montreal Canadian National 5–0 in the 2nd game (31-Jul-1930)
Westminster Royals 1–0 in the 3rd game (3-Aug-1930)

Rosters

Montreal
Nelson; Barnes and Duguid; Low, Kerr and Campbell; Howley, Henderson, Bill Finlayson, Westwater, Green.

New Westminster
Sanford; Anderson and Waugh; Les Rimmer, Stoddart and Delaney; McDougall, Trotter, Coulter, Turner, D'Easum.

References

Canadian National Challenge Cup
Canadian Challenge Trophy
1930 in Canadian soccer